The 1983 Austrian Grand Prix was a Formula One motor race held at the Österreichring on 14 August 1983. It was the eleventh race of the 1983 FIA Formula One World Championship.

The 53-lap race was won by Alain Prost, driving a factory Renault, with Drivers' Championship rivals René Arnoux and Nelson Piquet second and third in a Ferrari and a Brabham-BMW respectively. With the win, Prost extended his lead in the Drivers' Championship to 14 points with four races remaining. However, this would turn out to be the final victory for the original factory Renault team.

Classification

Qualifying

Race

Championship standings after the race

Drivers' Championship standings

Constructors' Championship standings

References

Austrian Grand Prix
Grand Prix
Austrian Grand Prix
Austrian Grand Prix